is a picture scroll by Edo period Japanese artist Sawaki Suushi. Completed in 1737, this scroll is a supernatural bestiary, a collections of ghosts, spirits and monsters (Yōkai), which Suushi based on literature, folklore, other artwork. These images had a profound influence on subsequent yōkai imagery in Japan for generations.

Scroll gallery

See also
List of legendary creatures from Japan
Tsukumogami

References

Japanese art
Yōkai
1737 works
Edo-period works
1737 in Japan